Morand Racing is an auto racing team founded by former racing driver Benoît Morand and based in Marly, Switzerland.  The team traces its origins to 2000 when Morand founded PoleVision Racing which competed in numerous open-wheel series before switching to sports cars until 2011.  The team was reformed as Morand Racing in 2012, and has competed in the European Le Mans Series since 2013 with a Morgan Le Mans Prototype.

For 2015 Morand has formed a partnership with the Japanese SARD organization to compete in the FIA World Endurance Championship, expanding the team to two Morgan prototypes.

For 2016 season Morand changed its partnership to Mexican driver Ricardo González to form "RGR Sport by Morand" with a new Ligier JS P2. They won the opening round of the championship at Silverstone as well as their home race, the 6 Hours of Mexico with the pole position and fastest lap too.

Complete FIA World Endurance Championship results

* Season still in progress.

References

Swiss auto racing teams
Formula BMW teams
European Le Mans Series teams
FIA World Endurance Championship teams
24 Hours of Le Mans teams

Auto racing teams established in 2000
Auto racing teams established in 2012